Hesselberg is a hill of Hesse, Germany.

Hills of Hesse
Mountains and hills of the Taunus